The 2023 season for  started in New Zealand with the New Zealand Cycle Classic in January. This is the first season for the team as a UCI ProTeam having spent the last three years as a UCI Continental team.

2023 roster

Riders who joined the team for the 2023 season

Riders who left the team during or after the 2022 season

January
The team started at the New Zealand Cycle Classic with the aim to take victory again after Mark Stewart won last year. With Stewart not there the team had James Oram as their leader. Stage 1 was a flat race with a small punchy hill at the end. With 30 km to go there were four riders up the road when Oram jumped across to make it five. The five made it to the line together holding off the bunch by 17 seconds with Oram taking the sprint. Stage 2 was a flat stage which ended in a mass bunch sprint where Luke Mudgway finished third in the same time as the winner. oram was safely in the bunch and retained the overall lead. The Queen stage was Stage 3 which finished up Admiral Hill. Black Spoke controlled the breaks for most of the day making sure no one had an advantage for the climb. At the bottom of the climb Josh Burnett attacked taking Dutch rider Adne van Engelen with him. The two fought hard over the last few kilometres with Burnett attacking just before the line to take the stage. Burnett moved up to second overall now five seconds behind Oram who kept his yellow jersey going into Stage 4. Stage 4 was a 126 km stage which ended in a mass bunch sprint. Mudgway started sprinting with 300m to go and held off the others to win the stage. With Oram in yellow going into the final stage,  worked hard to not let any break get too large a gap on the 49.6 km stage. The race ended in another mass sprint where Mudgway was edged out by Lucas Carstensen. With that second place Mudway won the Points classification and Oram won the overall title.

The second race for the team was the Gravel and Tar Classic. Black Spoke was one of three teams to field six riders out of the 63 who started, of those only 30 finished the race. With 80 km of the  137.4 km route to go there was a bunch of eight riders leading the race. Four riders from the team were in the bunch; Burnett, James Fouché, Mudgway and Paul Wright. On one of the Gravel climbs with 40 km to go Fouché and Ben Oliver rode away from the other six. The pair held a decent gap until Fouché punctured and he had to wait for assistance. Oliver made it all the way to the finish line solo with Fouché finishing 3' 16" down in second place. Wright was the third man home finishing 3' 31" down on Oliver. Burnett and Mudgway finished fifth and sixth respectively with their other two team members finishing in the top 15.

It was then off to the New Zealand National Criterium Championships. The race was controlled by the team stopping nay major breaks from getting too much time. Fouché pulled the leadout over the final climb splitting the bunch, Wright then started the leadout before swinging off with 600m to go letting George Jackson lead Mudgway to the final 300m. Mudgway opened the sprint easily winning the national title ahead of Jackson and Kiaan Watts.

The final race in January for the team was the Cadel Evans Great Ocean Road Race, the team's first UCI World Tour event. The team was one of two UCI ProTeams invited to participate in the event. The circuit race had a tough hill in it with Mudgway being distanced on the penultimate lap. When a small group attacked off the front Fouché helped  bring the peloton back together. Ultimately the race ended in a 33-man bunch sprint with Aaron Gate the first from the team to cross the line, coming in 12th in the same time as the winner. Fouché commented on the team's efforts after the race saying; "All the boys rode super well and I think we showed we belong at this level."  This was backed up by three riders finishing within eight seconds of the winner and Gate just outside the top 10.

February
With the 2023 edition of the Tour of Antalya cancelled due to the earthquakes that occurred three days previously. The first race of February became the New Zealand National Time Trial Championships. The team had four riders start in the elite men category and one in the Under-23. Aaron Gate won the Elite title beating George Bennett by six seconds. Gate dropped his chain on the course and had to stop and fix it losing time to Bennett. In the under-23 time trial Logan Currie defended his title winning with the fastest time of the day even beating the time of Gate in the elite race.

Season victories

Notes

National, Continental and World champions 2023

References

External links
 

2023 in New Zealand sport
2023 road cycling season by team